Serum amyloid A protein is a protein that in humans is encoded by the SAA2 gene.

References

Further reading